Four Ashes is a village in the district of South Staffordshire in Staffordshire, England, located about  west of Cannock,

The village was served by a station on the Rugby-Birmingham-Stafford Line of the Grand Junction Railway.  The station closed in 1959 although the railway line still runs past the village.

Four Ashes Hall is a 17th-century house in the village.  It is open for conferences and weddings and has been in the same family for 350 years.  It is still privately owned.

References 

Villages in Staffordshire